DXSF (96.1 FM), broadcasting as San Franz Radio 96.1, is a radio station owned and operated by Agusan Communications Foundation. Its studio is located at Brgy. San Isidro, San Francisco, Agusan del Sur.

References

Radio stations in Agusan del Sur
Radio stations established in 1997